HLA-B73 (B73) is an HLA-B serotype. The serotype identifies the HLA-B*7301 gene product.  Part of B*7301 is similar to the HLA-B22 family, however part resembles the domains seen in other apes. B73 is more common in Western Indian Ocean, Mediterranean and Africa. (For terminology help see: HLA-serotype tutorial)

Serotype
B*73:01 is one of the four B alleles that reacts with neither Bw4 nor Bw6.  The others are B*18:06, B*46:01, and B*55:03.

B*7301 frequencies

References

7